Willy or Willie is a masculine, male given name, often a diminutive form of William or Wilhelm, and occasionally a nickname. It may refer to:

People

Given name or nickname
 Willie Aames (born 1960), American actor, television director, and screenwriter
 Willie Allen (basketball) (born 1949), American basketball player and director of the Growing Power urban farming program
 Willie Allen (racing driver) (born 1980), American racing driver
 Willie Anderson (disambiguation)
 Willie Apiata (born 1972), New Zealand Army soldier, only recipient of the Victoria Cross for New Zealand
 Willie (footballer) (born 1993), Brazilian footballer Willie Hortencio Barbosa
 Willy Böckl (1893–1975), Austrian world champion figure skater
 Willy Bocklant (1941–1985), Belgian road racing cyclist
 Willy Bogner, Sr. (1909–1977), German Nordic skier
 Willy Bogner, Jr. (born 1942), German fashion designer and alpine skier
 Willie Bosket (born 1962), American convicted murderer whose numerous crimes committed as a minor led to a change in New York state law
 Willy Brandt (1913–1992), 4th chancellor of West Germany, originally a pseudonym of Herbert Frahm
 Willie Brown (disambiguation)
 Willy Busch (1907–1969), German footballer
 Willy Caballero (born 1981), Argentina football goalkeeper
 Willie Cauley-Stein (born 1969), American basketball player
 Willy Claes (born 1938), Belgian former politician and eighth Secretary General of NATO
 Willie Clancy (hurler) (born 1907), Irish hurler
 Willie Clancy (musician) (1918–1973), Irish uilleann piper
 Willie Colón (musician) (born 1950), New York musician and social activist
 Willie Colon (American football) (born 1983), American football player
 Willy Cheruiyot Kipkirui (born 1974), Kenyan long-distance runner
 Wee Willie Davis (1906–1981), American actor and professional wrestler
 Willie Davis (baseball) (1940–2010), American baseball player
 Willie Davis (basketball) (born 1945), American basketball player
 Willie Davis (defensive end) (1934–2020), American football player
 Willie Davis (wide receiver) (born 1967), American football player
 Willy De Clercq (1927–2011), Belgian politician, deputy prime minister and minister of finance
 Willie Dixon (1915–1992), American blues double-bassist, vocalist, songwriter, arranger and record producer
 Willy Eisenhart (1946–1995), American writer on art
 Willie Evans (disambiguation)
 Willie Christine King Farris (born 1927), older sister of Martin Luther King Jr. and his only living sibling
 Willy Fitz (1918–1993), Austrian football player and coach
 Willie Gault (born 1960), American football player and sprinter
 Willie Gay (born 1998), American football player
 Willie Stevenson Glanton (1922–2017), American politician
 Willy Goldberger (1898-1960s), German-Spanish cinematographer
 Willie Green (born 1981), American basketball player
 Willie Green (American football) (born 1966), American football player
 Willie Harris (born 1978), American baseball player
 Willie Harvey Jr. (born 1996), American football player
 Willie Hector (born 1939), American football player
 Willy van Hemert (1912–1993), Dutch actor, theatre and television director and songwriter
 Willy Hernangómez (born 1994), Spanish basketball player
 Willy Hess (composer) (1906–1997), Swiss musicologist, composer and Beethoven scholar
 Willy Hess (violinist) (1859–1939), German violinist and violin teacher
 Willie Heston (1878-1963), American football player
 William Higinbotham (1910–1994), American physicist and anti-nuclear proliferation activist
 Willie Horton (born 1951), American convicted murderer whose crimes during a furlough was a major issue in the 1988 US presidential campaign
 Willie Horton (baseball) (born 1942), American baseball player
 Willy In 't Ven (born 1943), Belgian former road racing cyclist
 Willie Ito (born 1934), American animator
 Willy Jäggi (1906–1968), Swiss footballer
 Willy F. James Jr. (1920–1945), African-American United States Army soldier posthumously awarded the Medal of Honor
 Willie John McBride (born 1940), Northern Irish former rugby union footballer who played as a lock for Ireland and the British and Irish Lions
 Willie Johnson (disambiguation)
 Willie Jones (disambiguation)
 Willy von Känel (1909–1991), Swiss footballer
 Willy Kanis (born 1984), Dutch female racing cyclist
 Willie Otey Kay (1894–1992), American dressmaker
 Willy van de Kerkhof (born 1951), Dutch footballer
 Willy Kernen (1929–2009), Swiss footballer
 Willy Komen (born 1987), Kenyan middle-distance runner
 Willie Lanier (born 1945), American football player
 Wilfrid Laurier (1841–1919), 7th Prime Minister of Canada
 Willy Ley (1906–1969), German science writer, spaceflight advocate and historian of science
 William Wallace Lincoln (1850–1862), third son of President Abraham Lincoln
 Willy Lindström (born 1951), Swedish ice hockey player 
 Willy Lust (born 1932), Dutch multi-sport track-and-field athlete
 Willie Person Magnum (1792-1861), American politician
 Willie Martinez (disambiguation)
 Willie Mays (born 1931), American Major League Baseball Hall-of-Fame player
 Willie McCovey (1938–2018), American baseball player
 Willie McGee (born 1958), American baseball player
 Willy McIntosh (born 1970), Thai actor, model and TV producer
 Willy Messerschmitt (1898–1978), German aircraft designer and manufacturer
 Willie Mitchell (disambiguation)
 Willie Mosconi (1913–1993), American pool player
 Willie Moretti (1894–1951), Italian-American mobster
 Willy Mutunga (born 1947), Kenyan lawyer, reformer and former Chief Justice of Kenya
 Willie Naulls (1934–2018), American basketball player
 Willie Nelson (born 1933), American country singer-songwriter, author, poet, actor, and activist
 Willy Van Neste (born 1944), Belgian retired road racing cyclist
 Willie Norwood (disambiguation)
 Guillermo "Willy" Oddó (1943–1991), Chilean musician
 Willie Ong (born 1963) Filipino cardiologist, media personality and politician
 Willie O'Ree (born 1935), first black player in the National Hockey League
 Willie Park, Sr. (1833–1903), Scottish golfer
 Willie Park, Jr. (1864–1925), American golfer and golf course architect, son of the above
 Willy Pogany (1882–1955), Hungarian illustrator of children's and other books
 Willie Randolph (born 1954), American former Major League Baseball player, coach and manager
 Willie Revillame (born 1961), Filipino television host, actor and recording artist
 Willy Rizzo (1928–2013), Italian photographer and designer
 Willie Robertson (born 1972), American TV personality, businessman, outdoorsman, hunter and author best known for appearing on the reality TV series Duck Dynasty
 Willy Røgeberg (1905–1969), Norwegian rifle shooter and 1936 Olympic champion
 Willy Rohr (1877–1930), German Army World War I officer and tactical innovator
 Willy Ronis (1910–2009), French photographer
 Willie Rushton (1937–1996), English cartoonist, comedian, actor and performer
 Willy Russell (born 1947), English dramatist, lyricist and composer
 Willy Sagnol (born 1977), French former football player and manager
 Willy Schäfer (actor) (born 1933), German television actor
 Willy Schäfer (handballer) (1913–1980), Swiss Olympic field handball player
 Willy Schärer (1903–1982), Swiss middle-distance runner
 Willie Scott (American football) (born 1959), American retired National Football League player
 Willie Sims (born 1958), American-Israeli basketball player
 Willy Sluiter (1873–1949), Dutch painter
 Willie "The Lion" Smith (1897–1973), American jazz pianist
 Willie Smith (alto saxophonist) (1910–1967), jazz alto saxophonist
 Willie "Big Eyes" Smith (1936–2011), American blues singer, harmonica player and drummer
 Willie Smith (offensive tackle, born 1937) (born 1937), American former football player
 Willie Smith (tight end) (born 1964), American former football player
 Willie Smith (offensive tackle, born 1986) (born 1986), American former football player
 Willy Spühler (1902–1990), Swiss politician
 Willibald Stejskal, Austrian football player (1914–1923) and manager (1924–1953)
 Willy Stöwer (1864–1931), German artist, illustrator and author
 Willie Sutton (1901–1980), American bank robber
 Willie Taggart (born 1976), American college football coach
 Willy Taveras (born 1981), former Major League Baseball player from the Dominican Republic
 Willy Teirlinck (born 1948), Belgian retired road cyclist
 Willie Thorne (1954–2020), English snooker player and sports commentator
 Willie Tonga (born 1983), Australian Rugby League player
 Willy Tröger (1928–2004), German footballer
 Willy Vanden Berghen (born 1939), Belgian retired road bicycle racer
 Willy Vandersteen (1913–1990), Belgian creator of comic books
 Willie Weeks (born 1947), American bass guitarist
 Willie Williams (disambiguation)
 Willie Wolfe (1951–1974), one of the founding members of the Symbionese Liberation Army terrorist group
 Willie Wolfgramm, Tongan rugby league player
 Willy Wolterstorff (1864–1943), German herpetologist and paleontologist
 Willie Wood (disambiguation)
 Willie Woodburn (1919–2001), Scottish footballer
 Willy Workman (born 1990), American-Israeli basketball player for Hapoel Jerusalem in the Israeli Basketball Premier League
 Willie Worsley (born 1945), American basketball player
 Willie Wright (disambiguation), multiple people
 Willie Young (disambiguation), multiple people

Surname
 Boxcar Willie (1931–1999), American country music singer
 Charles V. Willie (1927-2022), American sociologist and writer

Stage name, pen name, ring name or nom de guerre 
 Simeon Cuba Sarabia or Willy (1935–1967), Bolivian trade unionist and guerrilla under Che Guevara
 Henry Gauthier-Villars (1859–1931), French fin-de-siecle writer and music critic, pen name Willy
 Willy Corsari, Dutch singer and author born Wilhelmina Angela Schmidt (1897–1998)
 Willy DeVille, American singer and songwriter born William Paul Borsey, Jr. (1950–2009)
 Willy Moon, New Zealand-born singer and producer born William George Sinclair in 1989
 Willie Nile, American folk and rock singer and songwriter born Robert Anthony Noonan (born 1948)
 Willie Pep, American boxer born Guglielmo Papaleo (1922–2006)

Dogs
 Araki Fabulous Willy or Willy (2001–2008), a champion Tibetan Terrier
 Wheely Willy (1991–2009), angry dog

Fictional characters
 Chilly Willy, a cartoon character
 Willy Armitage, strongman and IMF agent in the TV series Mission: Impossible
 Willy Fog, protagonist in the Spanish animated series Around the World with Willy Fog
 Willy Loman, protagonist of the play Death of a Salesman by Arthur Miller
 Willie Lumpkin, supporting character in Marvel Comics 
 Willy Mackey, a villain from Double Dragon
 Willy Roper, in the British soap opera EastEnders
 Captain Willy Schultz, a comic book World War II soldier
 Wilhelmina "Willie" Scott, female lead character in the film Indiana Jones and the Temple of Doom
 Willie Stark, central character of the novel All the King's Men by Robert Penn Warren
 Willy Wonka, in Roald Dahl's children's novels and film adaptations thereof, owner of chocolate factory 
 Groundskeeper Willie, a recurring character on the television series The Simpsons
 Willy (EastEnders), a fictional dog
 Willy, a fictional killer whale in the films Free Willy, Free Willy 2: The Adventure Home, Free Willy 3: The Rescue, and Free Willy (TV series) Willy, a fictional sperm in the book Where Willy Went Willy, a sailor from Wigan in the Captain Pugwash series of British children's comic strips and books
 Willy, main character in Willy the Sparrow.
 Willie the Giant, a character in Mickey and the Beanstalk Willie, a whale in the Make Mine Music segment Willie the Whale Who Wanted to Sing at the Met Willie the Wildcat (Kansas State), mascot of the Kansas State University Wildcats
 Willie the Wildcat (Northwestern), mascot of the Northwestern University Wildcats
 Willie and Joe, comics characters created by Bill Mauldin
 King Willie, main villain in Predator 2
 Uncle Willy, character in the 1995 American horror comedy movie Demon Knight''
 Willie, a character from Netflix's Julie and the Phantoms.

See also
 Wili (disambiguation), includes list of people with the name Wili
 Willi, a given name
 Willye, given name
 William (name)
 Willies (disambiguation), includes list of people with the name Willies
 
 

Masculine given names
Hypocorisms
English masculine given names